Pete Hughes (born January 11, 1968) is an American college baseball coach and head coach of the Kansas State Wildcats baseball team. Previously he served as the head coach of the Oklahoma Sooners baseball and the Virginia Tech Hokies baseball team.

Playing career
After growing up in Brockton, Massachusetts, Hughes attended Boston College High School, lettering in both baseball and football for the Eagles. Hughes then was a four-year starting quarterback at Davidson College. He also played third base for the Wildcats baseball team.

Coaching career
After completing college, Hughes became an assistant coach for both baseball and football at Hamilton College. He stayed there for one academic year before moving to Northeastern in the same dual capacity. After five years, he decided to focus on baseball and landed his first head coaching job at Trinity University in Texas. Taking just two seasons to improve the Tigers to a conference championship, Hughes was hired by Boston College after the 1998 season. His success with the Eagles was also immediate, improving Boston College's record by nine wins in his first year. Hughes picked up a variety of Coach of the Year awards in his second season, including awards from the Big East Conference and regional selectors of the American Baseball Coaches Association. He would earn more such honors in 2002 and 2005. He also led the Eagles to the Big East Conference baseball tournament five times in seven years. Boston College had only appeared in the tournament once prior to his arrival.

Hughes was hired as head coach at Virginia Tech beginning in the 2007 season, replacing Hall of Famer Chuck Hartman, who had led the Hokies for the previous 28 years. Hughes has rebuilt the Hokies into a power, bringing the team back into the national rankings and to the Atlantic Coast Conference baseball tournament on a regular basis. Hughes earned a three-year contract extension after the 2009 season. He was hired by the Oklahoma Sooners in 2014. He was let go by the Sooners in June 2017.  On July 31, 2017, Hughes was named volunteer assistant at Georgia. On June 8, 2018, Hughes was named the head coach of the Kansas State Wildcats baseball team.

Head coaching record

See also
List of current NCAA Division I baseball coaches

References

External links
Pete Hughes, Head Baseball Coach, Kansas State Wildcats

1968 births
Baseball players from Massachusetts
Baseball coaches from Massachusetts
Boston College Eagles baseball coaches
Boston College High School alumni
Sportspeople from Brockton, Massachusetts
Davidson Wildcats baseball players
Davidson Wildcats football players
Georgia Bulldogs baseball coaches
Hamilton Continentals baseball coaches
Hamilton Continentals football coaches
Kansas State Wildcats baseball coaches
Living people
Northeastern Huskies baseball coaches
Northeastern Huskies football coaches
Oklahoma Sooners baseball coaches
Trinity Tigers baseball coaches
Virginia Tech Hokies baseball coaches